

61001–61100 

|-id=042
| 61042 Noviello ||  || Jessica Noviello (born 1992) completed her Ph.D. research at Arizona State University studying surface features on Europa to discern its internal structure. She applies those skills in analyzing the morphology of the asteroid (101955) Bennu for the OSIRIS-REx mission. || 
|}

61101–61200 

|-id=189
| 61189 Ohsadaharu ||  || Sadaharu Oh (born 1940), a world-renowned professional baseball player with the world lifetime home run record (868). He also won the World Baseball Classic Champion 2006 as manager of Team Japan. || 
|-id=190
| 61190 Johnschutt ||  || John Schutt  (born 1948) and American expert mountaineer who served for more than two decades as a member of the yearly field teams sent by the Antarctic Search for Meteorites Program to Antarctica. He played a key role in assuring that the expeditions were executed safely. As a participant he has found over 10,000 "earthbound minor planets" (Src). || 
|-id=195
| 61195 Martinoli ||  || Piero Martinoli (born 1941) is professor of physics and leader of the superconductivity research group at the University of Neuchatel. || 
|}

61201–61300 

|-id=208
| 61208 Stonařov ||  || Stonařov, Moravia, Czech Republic (Stannern in German), where an eucrite meteorite fell on 1808 May 22, on the occasion of the fall's 200th anniversary || 
|}

61301–61400 

|-id=342
| 61342 Lovejoy ||  || Terry Lovejoy (born 1966), Australian amateur astronomer and comet discoverer who also pioneered comet discovery via the internet in SOHO/LASCO data and through sky patrols using digital cameras. || 
|-id=384
| 61384 Arturoromer || 2000 QW || Arturo Romer (born 1944), a Swiss physicist and mathematician. He directed the Liceo Cantonale Locarno and is now director of the association Electricità della Svizzera Italiana || 
|-id=386
| 61386 Namikoshi ||  || Tokujiro Namikoshi (1905–2000), was a Japanese practitioner, who founded the Shiatsu therapy, which involves massage by thumb. His definition of Shiatsu was "The heart of Shiatsu is like a mother's love. Pressure of the finger causes the spring of life to flow". || 
|-id=400
| 61400 Voxandreae ||  || Andreae Deman (1945–2008) was an American planetarium narrator at the Von Braun Astronomical Society in Huntsville, Alabama. The "Voice of Andreae" was silenced with her death from leukemia. The asteroid's name, "Voxandreae", is Latin for "Voice of Andreae". || 
|}

61401–61500 

|-
| 61401 Schiff ||  || Leonard Isaac Schiff, (1915–1971) an American theoretical physicist who proposed the use of orbiting gyroscopes to check some of the effects of the theory of general relativity. His ideas led to the Gravity Probe B experiment. || 
|-id=402
| 61402 Franciseveritt ||  || Francis Everitt (born 1934), American physicist add professor at Stanford University, who is the principal investigator of the Gravity Probe B experiment. || 
|-id=404
| 61404 Očenášek ||  ||  (1872–1949), a Czech aviation and rocket pioneer who constructed a radial engine for airplanes and his own monoplane in 1905. He began systematic rocket research in 1928, and in 1930 his two-stage rockets reached an altitude of 1.5 km. He considered the launching of rockets from aircraft and the long-distance rocket delivery of mail.(Src). || 
|-id=444
| 61444 Katokimiko ||  || Kimiko Kato (born 1934) is a Japanese amateur astronomer who is committed to education and public outreach regarding small Solar System body impacts on Earth. She also studies impact craters and the K-T boundary in Japan. She has been a member of Japan Spaceguard Association since its establishment. || 
|}

61501–61600 

|-bgcolor=#f2f2f2
| colspan=4 align=center | 
|}

61601–61700 

|-bgcolor=#f2f2f2
| colspan=4 align=center | 
|}

61701–61800 

|-bgcolor=#f2f2f2
| colspan=4 align=center | 
|}

61801–61900 

|-bgcolor=#f2f2f2
| colspan=4 align=center | 
|}

61901–62000 

|-id=912
| 61912 Storrs ||  || Alex Storrs (born 1960) is an American astronomer and professor at Towson State University. He is known for developing innovative techniques for Hubble Space Telescope observations of solar system objects. He also pioneered searches for satellites of minor planets that revealed companions to 87 Sylvia, 107 Camilla and others. || 
|-id=913
| 61913 Lanning ||  || Howard Lanning (1946–2007) an American astronomer who validated astronomical software and assisted other astronomers at Mount Wilson, the National Optical Astronomical Observatories and the Space Telescope Science Institute. He also studied variable stars and catalogued ultraviolet-excess stars in the Sandage Two-color Survey of the Galactic Plane. || 
|}

References 

061001-062000